Lautarus concinnus is a species of longhorn beetle in the Cerambycinae subfamily, and the only species in the genus Lautarus. The species was described by Philippi and Philippi in 1859. It is known from Chile and southern Argentina.

References

Bimiini
Beetles described in 1859
Monotypic Cerambycidae genera